Pingwang may refer to the following places in China:

Pingwang, Jiangsu (平望), a town in Suzhou, Jiangsu
Pingwang Township, Hebei (平王乡), a township in Rongcheng County, Hebei
Pingwang Township, Shanxi (平旺乡), a township in Datong, Shanxi

See also
King Ping (disambiguation), also known as Pingwang
Ping Wang (disambiguation)